Benjamin Hadley (1871–1937) was an English footballer who played in the Football League for West Bromwich Albion.

References

1871 births
1937 deaths
English footballers
Association football midfielders
English Football League players
Hereford Thistle F.C. players
West Bromwich Albion F.C. players